Mordellistena gilvifrons is a beetle in the genus Mordellistena of the family Mordellidae. It was described in 1967 by Ermisch.

References

gilvifrons
Beetles described in 1967